The following are lists of notable deaths:
 Lists of deaths by year
 Lists of deaths by day
 List of assassinations
 List of unsolved deaths
 List of deaths in rock and roll
 List of deaths from drug overdose and intoxication
 Lists of people by cause of death
 List of unusual deaths